How the Lack of Love Affects Two Men is a 2006 South Korean film.

Plot 
Dong Chol-dong is a widower who lives with his only son, Dong-hyun. Chol-dong makes his living by blackmailing companies for their immoral activities, and in his spare time devotes himself to such activities as measuring the length of toilet paper, so he can sue the paper company if it is shorter than advertised. His son, Dong-hyun, is a bully who will go to any lengths to get what he wants. The lives of these two men take a turn when a divorced woman, Oh Mi-mi, rents a room in their house. Both fall in love with her, and they turn on each other to win her heart.

Cast 
 Baek Yoon-sik ... Dong Chol-dong
 Bong Tae-gyu ... Dong-hyun
 Lee Hye-young ... Oh Mi-mi
 Ahn Gil-kang ... bakery man
 Jung Woo ... ignorant
 Do Yoon-joo  ... laundry man
 Woo Hyeon ... supermarket man
 Hwang Seok-jeong ... supermarket woman

Release 
How the Lack of Love Affects Two Men was released in South Korea on 16 November 2006, and on its opening weekend topped the box office with 179,489 admissions. The film went on to receive a total of 593,277 admissions nationwide, with a gross (as of 26 November 2006) of $2,470,615.

References

External links 
 
 
 

2006 films
2000s Korean-language films
South Korean comedy films
Films directed by Kim Seong-hun
Lotte Entertainment films
2000s South Korean films